W. Godfrey Allen  (1891–1986), full name Walter Godfrey Allen, was an architect in the twentieth century.  He was Surveyor of the Fabric of St Paul's Cathedral from 1931 to 1956. He devised the St. Paul's Heights policy in 1937, a policy to stop the views of St. Paul's being blocked by tall buildings. He lived and worked in Priory Row, Faversham, and is commemorated there by a plaque on his old home. In 1951, he started a second term as the Prime Warden of the Worshipful Company of Goldsmiths. He was appointed a Commissioner for the Royal Commission on the Historical Monuments of England on 9 June 1952. He declined a British honour of Commander (CBE) in 1957.

Allan is jointly credited with designing a number of features in St Paul's with Stephen Dykes Bower. He was Master of the Art Workers Guild in 1953. He retired from Royal Institute of British Architects in 1970.

References

External links
 Isometric engraving of St Paul's by Allen and R. B. Brookes-Greaves at the Victoria and Albert Museum
 1942 photo at the National Portrait Gallery

1891 births
1986 deaths
20th-century English architects
People from Faversham
Architects from Kent
Masters of the Art Worker's Guild
Fellows of the Royal Institute of British Architects
Fellows of the Society of Antiquaries of London